The 1927 St. Louis Cardinals season was the team's 46th season in St. Louis, Missouri, and its 36th season in the National League. The Cardinals went 92–61 during the season and finished second in the National League.

Offseason 
 December 20, 1926: Rogers Hornsby was traded by the Cardinals to the New York Giants for Frankie Frisch and Jimmy Ring.

In a deal that shocked the baseball world, the Cardinals traded long-time star Rogers Hornsby on December 20, 1926, to the New York Giants for Frankie Frisch and Jimmy Ring. The deal was held up because Hornsby, as part of his contract as the manager of the Cardinals (he was a player-manager at the time), owned several shares of stock in the Cardinals. Cardinals owner Sam Breadon offered Hornsby a sum for the stock considerably lower than what Hornsby demanded for it, and neither would budge. Eventually, the other owners of the National League made up the difference, and the trade went through.

Regular season

Season standings

Record vs. opponents

Roster

Player stats

Batting

Starters by position 
Note: Pos = Position; G = Games played; AB = At bats; H = Hits; Avg. = Batting average; HR = Home runs; RBI = Runs batted in

Other batters 
Note: G = Games played; AB = At bats; H = Hits; Avg. = Batting average; HR = Home runs; RBI = Runs batted in

Pitching

Starting pitchers 
Note: G = Games pitched; IP = Innings pitched; W = Wins; L = Losses; ERA = Earned run average; SO = Strikeouts

Other pitchers 
Note: G = Games pitched; IP = Innings pitched; W = Wins; L = Losses; ERA = Earned run average; SO = Strikeouts

Relief pitchers 
Note: G = Games pitched; W = Wins; L = Losses; SV = Saves; ERA = Earned run average; SO = Strikeouts

Awards and honors

Records 
Frankie Frisch, National League record, Most chances accepted by a second baseman, (1037).
Frankie Frisch, National League record, Most assists by a second baseman, (641).

Farm system

References

External links
1927 St. Louis Cardinals at Baseball Reference
1927 St. Louis Cardinals team page at www.baseball-almanac.com

St. Louis Cardinals seasons
Saint Louis Cardinals season
St Louis